Marcus Miller is a Marcus Miller album released in the summer of 1984.

Reception
Allmusic awarded the album 3 stars and its review by Ed Hogan states: "Marcus Miller followed his debut LP, Suddenly, with this self-titled PRA/Warner Bros. album released during summer 1984. His fusion of funk/R&B/jazz is well-balanced on this effort and better represents his formidable talents as a bassist/songwriter/producer/vocalist/multi-instrumentalist."

Track listing
All tracks composed by Marcus Miller
"Unforgettable" – 5:45
"Is There Anything I Can Do" – 5:24
"Superspy" – 5:59
"Juice" – 6:40
"I Could Give You More" – 6:00
"Perfect Guy" – 5:52
"My Best Friend's Girlfriend" – 7:27
"Nadine" – 4:31

Source:

References

Marcus Miller albums
1984 albums
Albums produced by Marcus Miller
Warner Records albums